Neptis camarensis, or Schultze's sailer, is a butterfly in the family Nymphalidae. It is found in Nigeria (the Cross River loop), Cameroon and the western and central part of the Democratic Republic of the Congo. The habitat consists of primary forests.

References

Butterflies described in 1920
camarensis